This is a list of primary and secondary schools in the island of Ireland that operate under the ethos of the Roman Catholic Church, classified by the religious order to which they belong.

Augustinian Order
 Good Counsel College - New Ross
 St Augustine's College, Dungarvan - Dungarvan

Benedictine Order
 Glenstal Abbey School - Murroe

De La Salle Brothers
 De La Salle College - Churchtown, Dublin 
 De La Salle College - Dundalk
 De La Salle College - Waterford
 St Benildus College - Kilmacud, Dublin
 Ard Scoil La Salle] - Raheny, Dublin

Carmelite Order
 Terenure College - Terenure, Dublin

Christian Brothers
 The Abbey - Tipperary
 Ardscoil Rís - Dublin
 Ardscoil Rís, Limerick - Limerick
 Christian Brothers School - Charleville
 Christian Brothers School - Dungarvan
 Christian Brothers School - Roscommon
 Christian Brothers School - Sexton Street, Limerick
 Christian Brothers College - Monkstown, Dublin
 Christian Brothers College - Cork
 Midleton CBS - Midleton
 Clonkeen College - Deansgrange, Dublin
 Coláiste Íosagáin - Dublin
 Coláiste Éanna - Ballyroan, Dublin
 Coláiste Eoin - Booterstown, Dublin
 Coláiste Mhuire - Marino, Dublin
 Drimnagh Castle Secondary School - Drimnagh, Dublin
 O'Connell School - Dublin
 Our Lady's - Templemore
 Rice College - Ennis
 St. Aidan's - Dublin
 Saint Brendan's College - Bray
 St. Fintan's - Sutton, Dublin
 St. Joseph's C.B.S. - Fairview, Dublin
 St Mary's (The Green) - Tralee
 St. Vincent's - Glasnevin, Dublin
 Synge Street School - Dublin
 Waterpark College - Waterford

Northern Ireland

 Abbey Grammar School - Newry
 Christian Brothers School - Glen Road, Belfast
 Christian Brothers School - Omagh
 Edmund Rice College - Glengormley, Newtownabbey
 St Mary's Grammar School - Belfast

Cistercian Order
 Cistercian College - Roscrea

Dominican Order
 Scoil Chaitríona - Glasnaíon, Baile Átha Cliath 9
Dominican College - Griffith Avenue
Dominican College Sion Hill - Blackrock, Dublin
 Muckross Park College - Dublin
 Newbridge College - Newbridge

Faithful Companions of Jesus
 Laurel Hill Coláiste - Limerick

Franciscan Order
 Gormanston College - Gormanston
 St Francis College - Rochestown, Cork

Holy Ghost Fathers
 Blackrock College - Blackrock, Dublin
 Rockwell College - Cashel
 St Mary's College - Rathmines, Dublin
 St Michael's College - Dublin
 Templeogue College - Templeogue, Dublin

Marist Brothers
 Marian College - Dublin
 Marist College - Athlone
 Moyle Park College - Clondalkin, Dublin

Marist Fathers
 Catholic University School - Leeson Street, Dublin
 Chanel College - Coolock, Dublin
 St Mary's College - Dundalk, Co Louth

Patrician Brothers
 Patrician School - Newbridge
 St Joseph's Patrician College - Galway

Poor Servants of the Mother of God
 Manor House School - Raheny, Dublin

Presentation Brothers
 Coláiste Chríost Rí - Cork
 Coláiste an Spioraid Naoimh - Bishopstown, Cork
 Presentation College - Bray
 Presentation Brothers College - Cork

Presentation Sisters
 Calasanctius College - Oranmore
 Presentation College - Headford
 Scoil Mhuire - Clane
 Presentation - Tralee
 Killina Presintation Secondary School - Tullamore

Salesians of Don Bosco
 Salesian Secondary College (formerly Copsewood College) - Pallaskenry
 Salesian College - Celbridge

Sisters of Loreto
 Loreto Abbey, Dalkey 
 Loreto College, Balbriggan 
 Loreto College, Cavan 
 Loreto College, Foxrock
 Loreto College, Mullingar
 Loreto College, St Stephens Green, 
 Loreto College, Swords, 
 Loreto Convent Secondary School, Letterkenny
 Loreto Secondary School, Bray 
 Loreto Secondary School, Fermoy
 Loreto Secondary School, Kilkenny
 Loreto Secondary School, Navan

Sisters of Mercy
 Our Lady's Secondary School, Templemore
 Mercy College - Coolock, Dublin
 Sancta Maria College - Rathfarnham, Dublin
 St Joseph's - Navan
 St Joseph's - Tulla
 St Leo's College - Carlow
 Scoil an Spioraid Naoimh
St Vincent's Secondary School, Dundalk Louth

Society of Jesus
 Belvedere College - Dublin
 Clongowes Wood College - Clane
 Coláiste Iognáid - Galway
 Crescent College - Limerick
 Gonzaga College - Ranelagh, Dublin
 St Declan's School - Dublin

Society of the Sacred Heart
 Mount Anville School - Dundrum, Dublin
 Scoil an Chroí Ró Naofa

Vincentian Fathers
 Castleknock College - Castleknock, Dublin
 St. Paul's College - Raheny, Dublin

Unaffiliated Diocesan Schools
 St. Patrick's Classical School - Navan
 St. Flannan's College - Ennis
 Garbally College - Ballinasloe
 St. Brendan's - Killarney
 St Michael's College - Listowel
 St. Colman's College - Fermoy
 St Eunan's College - Letterkenny
 St. Finian's College - Mullingar
 St Jarlath's College - Tuam
 St Kieran's College - Kilkenny
 St Macartan's College - Monaghan
 St. Mary's College - Galway
 St. Mary's Knockbeg College - Carlow
 St Munchin's College - Limerick
 St Muredach's College - Ballina
 St Peter's College - Wexford
 Summerhill College - Sligo
 Coole National School - Summerhill, County Meath

See also
List of schools in the Republic of Ireland
List of fee-paying schools in Ireland

Catholic schools
Schools, Roman Catholic
Catholic schools by order